Gassaway station, also known as Coal & Coke Railway Company Depot, is a historic railway depot located at Gassaway, Braxton County, West Virginia. It was built in 1914, by the Coal and Coke Railway and later acquired by the Baltimore and Ohio Railroad.  It is a two-story, brick and stone, Romanesque Revival-style building measuring 78 feet wide and 35 feet deep. It features two projecting pavilions, each 26 feet long and projecting 6 feet.  It has a hipped roof with red ceramic "French tile."  Passenger service ceased in 1953, and the depot continued use as a maintenance shop through 1988.

It was listed on the National Register of Historic Places in 1994 as the Gassaway Depot.

References

Railway stations on the National Register of Historic Places in West Virginia
Romanesque Revival architecture in West Virginia
Railway stations in the United States opened in 1914
Buildings and structures in Braxton County, West Virginia
National Register of Historic Places in Braxton County, West Virginia
Former Baltimore and Ohio Railroad stations
Former railway stations in West Virginia